The 1999 Welsh Labour leadership election was held on 20 February 1999. Alun Michael was elected as Labour's nominee for First Secretary. Michael would go on to become First Secretary in a minority Labour government following the 1999 Assembly election. Runner up Rhodri Morgan went on to serve in Michael's first cabinet and then succeeded him as First Secretary in February 2000.

Electoral system

The new leader was elected using an Electoral College in which the votes of elected officials (Welsh Labour MPs, MEPs and assembly candidates), individual members and affiliates were weighted equally at a share of one-third each.

Candidates

Rhodri Morgan, Member of Parliament for Cardiff West.
Alun Michael, Secretary of State for Wales; Member of Parliament for Cardiff South and Penarth.

A third candidate, Swansea-based businessman and lawyer, Roger Warren Evans announced his intention to run saying he would be the party's "rank and file" representative, although ultimately he didn't stand.

Result

References

1999
1999 in Wales
Welsh Labour leadership election